Conchita Leeflang is a Surinamese-American actress, model and singer.

Biography
Leeflang moved to Brussels, Belgium at a very young age, where Mr. Leeflang was the Ambassador. Leeflang is multilingual, speaking English, Dutch, French, German, Spanish, Surinamese and Italian.

She has been a singer, model, and stage actress for many years until she moved to Los Angeles on a modeling contract where she decided to pursue Television and Film. Conchita Leeflang has won numerous awards for her outstanding body of work as a singer-songwriter. Leeflang has been professionally trained in drama and comedy by her acting coach Aaron Speiser. Some of her acting credits are Super Spy, Sliders, Baywatch, The X Show, The call of a Siren, The Women of the Tropics and De Vrouw van Jerry (Dutch).

Leeflang has been a recording artist for many years in Europe, where two of her albums went gold, and two went Platinum. She was also involved in many different projects: a duo with Plastic Bertrand, Black Kiss The Bang Gang, and many more. She has appeared in many TV programs, like MTV, Zapper ne pas Jouer, Jacque Martin, and top of the pops, and in 2004, the documentary The Youngest Guns featured her song "This is My Life". Conchita joined the cast of Nederlandse Hollywood Vrouwen as one of the four women in their second season in 8 episodes, after doing an appearance in season one which aired on net5. The remaining cast consist of Inge, Yolanda Foster and Myrthe Mylius.

Leeflang had a relationship with singer Kid Rock lasting a little more than a year.

Leeflang is the mother of one child: a girl named London Victoria. With the inspiration of her daughter came a clothing line of which Conchita is the CEO.
Baby London Victoria.

In 2014 Conchita Leeflang became an Author of the published book "Travel the world with London Victoria," in which she explores different countries in the eye of her daughter. This children's book is based partially on real life, and some of the characters are fiction. 

Recently, Conchita joined the United States group of inventors after she put a patent on a new device that can apply lashes faster. Conchita is the owner and CEO of Con-Lee lashes international.

Published works

Discography
Conchita Leeflang "Hoshana, Don't fade away" (1988)
Black Kiss Featuring Conchita, Jump on the floor
Black Kiss Featuring Conchita, Fun Boy' (1990)
Black Kiss Featuring Conchita, Time out (1990) 
Club Control feat. Plastic Bertrand, 'House Machine (1991)
Bang Gang* Featuring Conchita, Bang Gang Night (1995)
Conchita Leeflang* This is my life (2004)
Conchita Leeflang*  Broken Wings (2014) Cover from Mr. Mister
Conchita Leeflang* I brake before i fall (2016)

Filmography
1998: Sliders (Secretary, episode "Virtual Slide")
2000: The Cheapest Movie Ever Made (Bond girl)
2003: Performing as... (Tina Turner)
2004: Super Spy (Stephanie)
2006: Unbeatable Harold (Ursula)
2012: "Nederlandse Hollywood vrouwen"
2014: "Children of divorced parents" Song

References

External links
Official site

People from Paramaribo
20th-century Surinamese women singers
Surinamese actresses
Living people
Year of birth missing (living people)
21st-century Surinamese women singers